Council of Officers was composed out of the General Officer Staff and colonels. It took part in the General Military Council. During times of Kyrylo Rozumovsky (1750-64), the Council of Officers completely overtook all functions of the General Military Council.

After the death of Bohdan Khmelnytsky, the Council of Officers (Rada Starshyn) became the main state body that was electing the Hetman of Zaporizhian Host as well as other key administrative state posts. It reviewed decisions of the General Chancellery, and appellation to the decisions of the General Court and the General Chancellery. The council consisted of the most wealthy and influential representatives of officers' families. After the complete abolition of Hetman post, it was subordinated to the Collegium of Little Russia for a short period.

Key roles
 Decision on the most important political, administration and military issues
 Conducting diplomatic relations
 Headed financial and judicial institutions as well as the Armed Forces

External links
 Handbook on history of Ukraine
 General officers at website of the Institute of History of Ukraine

Government of the Cossack Hetmanate
Military history of Ukraine